The Canadian Society for History and Philosophy of Mathematics (CSHPM) is dedicated to the study of the history and philosophy of mathematics  in Canada. It was proposed by Kenneth O. May, in conjunction with the journal Historia Mathematica, and was founded in 1974.

See also 
Canadian Mathematical Society
List of Mathematical Societies

References

Mathematical societies
History of mathematics
History organizations based in Canada
Philosophical societies in Canada